is a player character in the Dead or Alive fighting game franchise by Team Ninja and Tecmo (Tecmo Koei). Making her debut in 2001's Dead or Alive 3, she is the designated femme fatale of the series, depicted as a villainous British assassin and Shé Quán practitioner hired by the series' main antagonist, Victor Donovan, to kill protagonist Helena Douglas. Christie has appeared on series merchandise and the feature film DOA: Dead or Alive which she was portrayed by Holly Valance, and like the games' other female characters, has received positive critical reception based mainly on her sex appeal.

Design and gameplay
Christie is officially listed as 5'9½" in height and 126 pounds in weight, making her the largest female character in the game. The original character design depicted her with a heart-shaped face, round eyes, and spiky blonde hair. For her revamped design in Dead or Alive 5, she was given more realistic facial features, and her hair became longer and straighter. Christie has some of the more revealing outfits among the series' female characters; as part of her default Dead or Alive 4 costume, she wears only an open leather jacket that conceals her bare breasts. Her costumes nevertheless include some more modest outfits, such as a black business suit. Pre-order bonuses for Dead or Alive 5 Last Round offered by Amazon.com included a downloadable "Showstopper" costume for the character. Christie's post-release Last Round DLC costumes include a ninja outfit, a costume designed by Tamiki Wakaki, and "cosplay" costumes based on Esty from Atelier, Mari Yukishiro from Schoolgirl Strikers, Masamune Date from Samurai Warriors, Miyabi from Senran Kagura, Zava from Ys Origin, and the uniform of the Scout Regiment from Attack on Titan, among others.

Anthony Chau of IGN considered Christie "one of the fastest ... of all DOA 3 characters", while having "a bit more power to her punches [and] the quickest hand strikes ... she can rack up ten-hit combos without breaking a sweat," a sentiment echoed by GameSpy in their Dead or Alive 4 strategy guide. Like Ayane, Christie has a separate offense for her reverse stance in Dead or Alive 4, in which her back is turned toward the opponent.

Appearances

In video games

In the Dead or Alive series, Christie is a cold and heartless professional assassin who relishes her occupation for the act of killing rather than the financial reward. She employs any means necessary to attain her mission objectives, including using her looks, charm, and sex appeal to lure her intended victims, though on occasion she will flirt with her male targets in lieu of killing them.

Victor Donovan, a powerful antagonistic figure in the Dead or Alive Tournament Executive Committee (DOATEC), hires her as a double agent to keep an eye on Helena Douglas, daughter of Fame Douglas and the heir of DOATEC. During the events of the original Dead or Alive, Christie joins another of Donovan's hired killers, Bayman, in assuring that the ninja Kasumi enters the tournament. Christie abducts and brings Kasumi to Donovan for Project Alpha.

Before the events of Dead or Alive 2 (1999), in which Christie is not playable, she is ordered by Donovan to assassinate Helena Douglas, who had inherited DOATEC after her father's death, in turn serving as a roadblock to Donovan's attempted takeover of the tournament. Christie attempts to kill Helena with a sniper rifle but Helena's mother Maria intentionally takes the fatal bullet instead. Christie manages to escape and succeeds in later posing as Helena's personal assistant.

Christie is player-controllable for the first time in Dead or Alive 3. Her objective therein is to prevent Helena from winning the third Dead or Alive tournament, and in the process prevent her from uncovering more of Donovan's plans. When she does confront Helena, she is stopped by Bayman, who is seeking revenge on Donovan for having ordered a hit on him. Christie commands a clone of Kasumi to defeat Helena, a task that fails. Christie kidnaps CIA agent Irene Lew to lure the ninja Ryu Hayabusa away from his friends Hayate and Ayane.

In Dead or Alive 4, Christie serves as Donovan's bodyguard, but they are unable to prevent the Mugen Tenshin ninja clan (Hayate, Ayane) and Ryu from destroying DOATEC's Tritower headquarters. As the tower is engulfed in flames, Christie finds Helena inside and reveals that she killed Maria. After an inconclusive fight, Christie flees the tower, while Helena is rescued from the building and becomes the new leader of the Dead or Alive tournaments. At the end of the game, Christie is shown stripping at a club, assassinating a man by seducing him and piercing a needle through his spinal cord.  Christie goes on to continue her work as an assassin for hire, a role she resumes in Dead or Alive Xtreme 2 (2006).

In Dead or Alive 5 (2012), she again serves under Donovan, this time for his new organization MIST. She visits a DOATEC oil platform and confronts worker Rig, insinuating that she knows about his past. She increases security on the rig at Donovan's command when he learns that the Mugen Tenshin plan on infiltrating it. However, she is defeated in battle by Bayman, and then Kasumi. The ninja clan ultimately destroys the rig, and Christie's whereabouts are unknown afterward.

Other appearances

Film
Christie is a protagonistic character in the 2006 live-action film DOA: Dead or Alive, and was played by Australian actress and model Holly Valance. She was given a surname (Allen), while her hair is a normal blonde instead of the white from the games. Christie is depicted as more approachable and social than her in-game counterpart but retains her role of master thief and assassin, working with a noncanonical character named Max (Matthew Marsden) to steal Donovan's $100 million fortune hidden in a vault on the tournament grounds.

Merchandise
Dead or Alive merchandise of the character include several figures by various manufacturers such as Bandai, Epoch and Kotobukiya. Famitsu released a series of pencil boards.

Reception

Like the Dead or Alive series' other female fighters, Christie has been well received by gaming media particularly for her sex appeal, in addition to her personality. She placed fourth in GameTrailers' 2007 top-ten list of "gamer babes", and was included in UGO Networks' 2010 list of their top fifty "videogame hotties". Gavin Mackenzie of Play joked that her chest was among what gamers could expect to see in Dead or Alive 5. "Christie is an assassin so her breasts are silent, deadly, ruthless and will kill anyone for money." She placed second in GamesRadar's 2008 ranking of the top seven video-game shower scenes, and was featured in Virgin Media's 2010 list of ten "game girls you wouldn't dare to date", for her being "different" from "the dead eyed, porcelain features of most of the Dead or Alive girls", but the site added, "Being a villain, naturally she’s given a British accent." In 2008, GameDaily rated Christie ("definitive bad girl") among the top ten "babes who shouldn't meet your mom", and in their list of the top twenty-five "hottest game babes" at fourteenth. The Brazilian edition of Official Xbox Magazine ranked Christie the fourth-sexiest woman in fighting games in 2013, calling her "a perfect choice for those who enjoy bad girls." Her game and film incarnations were simultaneously included among the "hottest video game babes" by the New Zealand edition of MSN Lifestyle. Wirtualna Polska showcased Christie among the 20 "sexiest girls from games" in 2012, and Interia.pl included Ayane, Christie and Kasumi among their "sexiest game heroines" the same year.

While she was ranked eighth in Complex's 2012 selection of the fifteen "hottest women in video game movies", reception to Christie's portrayal in DOA: Dead or Alive has  otherwise been negative, often with sarcastic undertones. Eric Snider of Film.com described Christie and the other female characters therein as "prefer[ring] to conduct their daily affairs unencumbered by clothing."  Chris Sims of Comics Alliance commented on her introductory scene that included a confrontation with police officers: "My favorite thing ... is when Christie emerges from the shower naked, but in full makeup. The half-naked fight scene [that follows] comes in at a pretty hilarious second." IGN wrote that Christie's "fighting off assailants [while] wearing nothing but a towel, and then escaping via motorcycle ... with one of the most hilariously blatant cameltoe moments" made the film "worth seeing." Total Film described the sequence as "pillow-soft porn". BBC Online described a later fight scene between Christie and Helena as "an FHM photo shoot turned violent." It placed eleventh out of eighteen "best cinematic girl-on-girl fights" ranked by fans in a 2012 online poll held by JoBlo.com. Gavin Burke of entertainment.ie rated the film itself one star out of five, "for Holly Valance alone", and Brian Marder of Hollywood.com opined that Valance "makes her sultry fighter hot enough to distract from her ho-hum acting." Marca Player called the film "very bad", but felt Christie was "great."

See also
List of Dead or Alive characters

Notes

References

External links
  (Dead or Alive 5)

Dead or Alive (franchise) characters
Female characters in video games
Female video game villains
Fictional assassins in video games
Fictional bodyguards in video games
Fictional British people in video games
Fictional criminals in video games
Fictional dominatrices
Fictional English people
Fictional martial artists in video games
Fictional volleyball players
Fictional secret agents and spies in video games
Fictional Shé Quán practitioners
Video game characters introduced in 2001
Woman soldier and warrior characters in video games